The {{nihongo|Type L submarine'''|L型潜水艦|L-gata Sensuikan}} submarines were medium-sized submarines of the Imperial Japanese Navy (IJN), serving during the 1920s and World War II. The Type L submarines were built with Vickers naval technical guidance. All boats were built in the Mitsubishi Heavy Industries-Kobe Shipyard by the contract with Vickers.

Class variants
The Type L  submarines were divided into four classes:
 
 
 
 

Type L1 (Ro-51-class)

In 1916, the Mitsubishi Shipbuilding Corporation got the Vickers L class submarine informations. Mitsubishi which lost competition to the Kawasaki's Type F submarines (Fiat-Laurenti design, Ro-1 class and Ro-3 class), bought the license for the L class submarine from Vickers. The IJN hoped an improvement of submarine technologies will be achieved and ordered this submarine from Mitsubishi. Mitsubishi bought six submarine kits, and built two boats by semi-knock down. The submarine crews were satisfied with the Vickers diesels because they proved to be reliable. The IJN studied the diesel engines and made many variants of similar design, for example: Kampon Mk.24 diesel for the Ro-100 class.

Boats in class

Type L2 (Ro-53-class)

The Type L2 had minor changes from the Type L1. The changes were:
The ship's side torpedo tubes were removed.
Changed the batteries. (The L1 was equipped 3 groups, 336 small-sized batteries. The L2 was equipped 2 groups, 224 medium-sized batteries.)
Boats in class

Type L3 (Ro-57-class)

The Type L3 is a license production model of the British L class submarine Group 2.
Boats in class

Type L4 (Ro-60-class)

The Type L4 is a license production model of the British L class submarine Group 3. Their performance was good. The IJN was satisfied with them and stopped the development of Kaichū type submarines for a long time. Later the IJN was not able to regain the technical delay in development of the medium-sized submarines until the end of the Pacific War.
Boats in class
{| class="wikitable"
| width="7%" | Boat| width="5%" | Laid down| width="5%" | Launched| width="5%" | Completed| width="12%" | Results| width="15%" | Note, fate'''
|-
| ex-Submarine No. 59| 05-12-1921
| 20-12-1922
| 17-09-1923
| 
| Renamed Ro-60 01-11-1924. Lost in an accident at Kwajalein 29-12-1941.
|-
| ex-Submarine No. 72
| 05-06-1922
| 19-05-1923
| 09-02-1924
| Damaged  30-08-1942
| Renamed Ro-61 01-11-1924. Sunk by  31-08-1942.
|-
| ex-Submarine No. 73
| 08-09-1922
| 29-09-1923
| 24-07-1924
| 
| Renamed Ro-62 01-11-1924. Decommissioned 20-11-1945. Scuttled at Iyo-nada, May 1946.
|-
| ex-Submarine No. 84
| 02-04-1923
| 24-01-1924
| 20-12-1924
| 
| Renamed Ro-63 01-11-1924. Decommissioned 20-11-1945. Scuttled at Iyo-nada, May 1946.
|-
| ex-Submarine No. 79
| 15-10-1923
| 19-08-1924
| 30-04-1925
| 
| Renamed Ro-64 01-11-1924. Sunk by naval mine at Hiroshima Bay 12-04-1945.
|-
| 
| 15-11-1924
| 19-09-1925
| 30-06-1926
| 
| Lost in an accident at Kiska 04-11-1942.
|-
| 
| 01-12-1925
| 25-10-1926
| 28-07-1927
| 
| Collided with Ro-62 and sunk southwest of Wake Island 17-12-1941.
|-
| 
| 05-03-1925
| 18-03-1926
| 15-12-1926
| 
| Decommissioned 20-07-1945. Scuttled off Sasebo, July 1948.
|-
| 
| 06-02-1924
| 23-02-1925
| 29-10-1925
| 
| Decommissioned 30-11-1945. Scuttled off Maizuru, 30-04-1946.
|-
|}

Characteristics

Bibliography
, History of Pacific War Extra, "Perfect guide, The submarines of the Imperial Japanese Forces", Gakken (Japan), March 2005, 
The Maru Special, Japanese Naval Vessels No.43 Japanese Submarines III, Ushio Shobō (Japan), September 1980, Book code 68343-44
The Maru Special, Japanese Naval Vessels No.132 Japanese Submarines I "Revised edition", Ushio Shobō (Japan), February 1988, Book code 68344-36
The Maru Special, Japanese Naval Vessels No.133 Japanese Submarines II "Revised edition", Ushio Shobō (Japan), March 1988, Book code 68344-37

References

L type submarine, Japan
 
Submarines of the Imperial Japanese Navy